Alpha Pavonis (α Pavonis, abbreviated Alpha Pav, α Pav), formally named Peacock , is a binary star in the southern constellation of Pavo, near the border with the constellation Telescopium.

Nomenclature

α Pavonis (Latinised to Alpha Pavonis) is the star's Bayer designation.

The historical name Peacock was assigned by Her Majesty's Nautical Almanac Office in the late 1930s during the creation of the Air Almanac, a navigational almanac for the Royal Air Force. Of the fifty-seven stars included in the new almanac, two had no classical names: Alpha Pavonis and Epsilon Carinae. The RAF insisted that all of the stars must have names, so new names were invented. Alpha Pavonis was named "Peacock" ('pavo' is Latin for 'peacock') whilst Epsilon Carinae was called "Avior". In 2016, the International Astronomical Union organized a Working Group on Star Names (WGSN) to catalog and standardize proper names for stars. The WGSN's first bulletin of July 2016 included a table of the first two batches of names approved by the WGSN; which included Peacock for this star and Avior for Epsilon Carinae.

Properties

At an apparent magnitude of 1.94, this is the brightest star in Pavo. Based upon parallax measurements, this star is about  distant from the Earth. It has an estimated six times the Sun's mass and 6 times the Sun's radius, but 2,200 times the luminosity of the Sun. The effective temperature of the photosphere is 17,700 K, which gives the star a blue-white hue. It has a stellar classification of B3 V, although older studies have often given it a subgiant luminosity class. It is classified as B2.5 IV in the Bright Star Catalogue.

Stars with the mass of Alpha Pavonis are believed not to have a convection zone near their surface. Hence the material found in the outer atmosphere is not processed by the nuclear fusion occurring at the core. This means that the surface abundance of elements should be representative of the material out of which it originally formed. In particular, the surface abundance of deuterium should not change during the star's main sequence lifetime. A possible scenario for the latter is that the deuterium was burned through while Alpha Pavonis was a pre-main-sequence star.

The system is likely to be a member of the Tucana-Horologium association that share a common motion through space. The estimated age of this association is 45 million years. α Pavonis star has a peculiar velocity of  relative to its neighbors.

Companions
Three stars have been listed as visual companions to α Pavonis: two ninth magnitude stars at about four arc minutes; and a 12th magnitude F5 main sequence star at about one arc minute. The two ninth magnitude companions are only 17 arc seconds from each other.

α Pavonis A is a spectroscopic binary consisting of a pair of stars that orbit around each other with a period of 11.753 days. However, in part because the two stars have not been individually resolved, little is known about the companion except that it has a mass of at least . One attempt to model a composite spectrum estimated components with spectral types of B0.5 and B2, and a brightness difference between the two components of 1.3 magnitudes.

References

External links
Peacock - Jim Kaler's Stars

Pavonis, Alpha
B-type subgiants
193924
100751
7790
Pavo (constellation)
Spectroscopic binaries
Peacock
Durchmusterung objects